M. G. Road is a station of Kochi Metro. It was opened on 3 October 2017 as a part of the extension of the metro system from Palarivattom to Maharaja's College. The station is located between Town Hall and Maharaja's College. The name of the station refers to Mahatma Gandhi Road.

References

Kochi Metro stations
Railway stations in India opened in 2017